Anabel Medina Garrigues was the defending champion, but lost to Maria Elena Camerin in the first round.

Top seed Sara Errani won the title by beating Barbora Záhlavová-Strýcová 6–1, 6–3 in the final. She did not drop a set the entire tournament.

Seeds

Draw

Finals

Top half

Bottom half

Qualifying

Seeds

Qualifiers

Lucky losers
  Sacha Jones

Draw

First qualifier

Second qualifier

Third qualifier

Fourth qualifier

References
 Main Draw
 Qualifying Draw

Internazionali Femminili di Palermo - Singles
2012 Singles